Jimma Horo is a woreda in Oromia Region, Ethiopia. It is part of the Kelem Welega Zone. The administrative center of this woreda is Nunu. Jimma Horo was separated from former Jimma Gidami woreda.

Demographics 
The 2007 national census reported a total population for this woreda of 45,889, of whom 23,128 were men and 22,761 were women; 2,845 or 6.2% of its population were urban dwellers. The majority of the inhabitants were Protestants, with 40.52% reporting that as their religion, while 29.86% observed Ethiopian Orthodox Christianity, and 29.44% observed Islam.

Notes 

Districts of Oromia Region